Jaanika is a village in Saue Parish, Harju County in northern Estonia. Prior to the administrative reform of Estonian local governments in 2017, the village belonged to Nissi Parish.

Jaanika has a station on the Elron western route.

References

Villages in Harju County